German submarine U-621 was a Type VIIC U-boat built for Nazi Germany's Kriegsmarine for service during World War II.
She was laid down on 1 July 1941 by Blohm & Voss in Hamburg as yard number 597, launched on 19 March 1942 and commissioned on 7 May 1942 under Kapitänleutnant Horst Schünemann.

Design
German Type VIIC submarines were preceded by the shorter Type VIIB submarines. U-621 had a displacement of  when at the surface and  while submerged. She had two shafts and two  propellers.

U-621 was fitted with five  torpedo tubes (four fitted at the bow and one at the stern), fourteen torpedoes, one  SK C/35 naval gun, 220 rounds, and a  C/30 anti-aircraft gun. The boat had a complement of between forty-four and sixty.

Service history
The boat's service began on 7 May 1942 for training as part of the 8th U-boat Flotilla. After training was completed she transferred to the 9th flotilla on 1 October 1942 for active service.

She also damaged two more ships.

Wolfpacks
She took part in eleven wolfpacks, namely:
Panther (10 – 16 October 1942)
Puma (16 – 29 October 1942)
Raufbold (11 – 18 December 1942)
Hartherz (3 – 7 February 1943)
Ritter (11 – 26 February 1943)
Burggraf (4 – 5 March 1942)
Raubgraf (7 – 15 March 1943)
Amsel 1 (3 – 6 May 1943)
Elbe (7 – 10 May 1943)
Elbe 2 (10 – 14 May 1943)
Mosel (19 – 24 May 1943)

Fate

Summary of raiding history

References

Notes

Citations

Bibliography

External links

Ships lost with all hands
German Type VIIC submarines
1942 ships
U-boats commissioned in 1942
U-boats sunk in 1944
U-boats sunk by Canadian warships
World War II submarines of Germany
World War II shipwrecks in the Atlantic Ocean
Ships built in Hamburg
Maritime incidents in August 1944